Here's the World for Ya is the fourth album by Paul Hyde and the Payolas, the band previously known as Payolas. Released in 1985, the album is only available on vinyl and cassette; it has not been released on CD.
The album was #26 in Canada for 2 weeks.

This album was the only Payolas album produced by David Foster, who had been hired to bolster the band's commercial appeal.  While promoting the record in 1985, Bob Rock claimed that "[Foster] didn't take us anywhere we didn't already want to go.  Even if David hadn't produced this record, I think it still would have had a more professional sheen than our other albums, because that's what we wanted."

Subsequent to this album's release (and A&M's decision to drop the band from that label), the group re-branded themselves as "Rock and Hyde". The liner notes of Rock and Hyde's only LP, Under the Volcano, tell a different story about the band's opinion of Foster's work on this album:  "A very special thanks to our producer, Bruce Fairbairn who, risking sanity, did the decent thing and let us be ourselves (we can all look in the mirror in the morning now) and that's the way it should be!"

Track listing

Singles
"You're The Only Love"  --  (#26 Canada for 2 weeks)
"Stuck In The Rain"  --  (#77 Canada for 3 weeks)
"Here's The World"  --  (#91 Canada)
"It Must Be Love"  --  (#94 Canada)

Personnel
Paul Hyde and the Payolas
 Paul Hyde - vocals
 Bob Rock - guitars
 Alex "A-Train" Boynton - bass
 Chris Taylor - drums

with:
David Foster - keyboards and backing vocals
Christopher Livingston - keyboards 
Steve Porcaro - synth program
Christopher Allen - harmonica
Mark Rousseau - saxophone
Richard Marx - backing vocals
Paul Janz - backing vocals
Henri Lorieau - backing vocals
Sugar Jones - backing vocals
Mark Lafrance - backing vocals
Todd Smallwood - backing vocals

References

External links
 

1985 albums
Payolas albums
Albums produced by David Foster
A&M Records albums